The Standard Chartered Bank of Canada was the Canadian banking unit of the British Standard Chartered Bank. Standard Chartered bank was created by a merger of Standard Bank of British South Africa (1862) and the Chartered Bank of India, Australia and China (1853) in 1969. It quit Canada in the 1990s, selling its two retail branches to Bank of Montreal and its commercial branch to Toronto-Dominion Bank. Standard Chartered's separate metals services business Mocatta Metals was sold to Scotiabank in 1997 to form ScotiaMocatta.

Standard Chartered Bank operated two small offices in Calgary and Toronto through its acquisitions of Harrison Lovegrove & Co. and American Express Bank.

 Toronto - Gryphon Partners Canada Incorporated (20 Adelaide Street East) - ceased operations
 Calgary - Standard Chartered Corporate Finance (Canada) Limited (420, 635 8th Avenue SW, Hanover Place) - dissolved in 2018

See also

List of Canadian banks

References

External links
 Standard Chartered Bank - Canada
 Gryphon Partners

Defunct banks of Canada
Standard Chartered
Bank of Montreal
Banks established in 1969
Banks with year of disestablishment missing
Canadian companies established in 1969